German submarine U-651 was a German Type VIIC U-boat built for Nazi Germany's Kriegsmarine for service during World War II. She was ordered just after the war started in 1939, laid down on 16 January 1940, launched on 21 December that year and commissioned the following 21 February. She was commanded by Kapitänleutnant Peter Lohmeyer.

Her career was a short one. On 29 June 1941, she was sunk by the escort for the same convoy but 45 of her crew were rescued by the Royal Navy and interrogated by the Admiralty.

Design
German Type VIIC submarines were preceded by the shorter Type VIIB submarines. U-651 had a displacement of  when at the surface and  while submerged. She had two shafts and two  propellers.

U-651 was fitted with five  torpedo tubes (four fitted at the bow and one at the stern), fourteen torpedoes, one  SK C/35 naval gun, 220 rounds, and a  C/30 anti-aircraft gun. The boat had a complement of between forty-four and sixty.

Ships credited for the sinking of U-651
Destroyers
 
 
Corvettes
 
 
Minesweeper

Summary of raiding history

References

Bibliography

External links

World War II submarines of Germany
1940 ships
Ships built in Hamburg
U-boats commissioned in 1941
U-boats sunk by depth charges
U-boats sunk by British warships
World War II shipwrecks in the Atlantic Ocean
German Type VIIC submarines
U-boats sunk in 1941
Maritime incidents in June 1941